Gareth Valentine (born 22 November 1956) is a Welsh composer, arranger, conductor and musical director. He has worked extensively in London's West End on musical productions and also conducted orchestras worldwide including the BBC Concert Orchestra, Welsh National Opera Orchestra, BBC Symphony Orchestra, Pasdeloup orchestra, RPO Concert Orchestra, Queensland Symphony Orchestra, ENB Sinfonia, Orchestre de chambre de Paris and many others. After graduating from the Royal College of Music, London, he studied with Sir Peter Pears at Aldeburgh.

Early life
A native of Cefn Mawr, Valentine was educated at Ysgol Rhiwabon, Ruabon, Wrexham, Wales. He then graduated from the Royal College of Music, London, and later studied with Sir Peter Pears at the Advanced School of Singing and Strings Aldeburgh.

Professional career
Valentine was composer and music supervisor for Aladdin, the pantomime, at the Old Vic starring Ian McKellen and Roger Allam. His "Requiem" has been performed worldwide to international acclaim and was recorded at Abbey Road Studios, London. He was music supervisor for the Channel 4 television series "Musicality". He was commissioned to arrange George Gershwin's music for a ballet, Strictly Gershwin, for English National Ballet which was presented in 2008 at the Royal Albert Hall, London and which he also conducted. The Times called the musical contribution "outstanding". Strictly Gershwin was presented by Queensland Ballet (2016) and Tulsa Ballet (2018)

Credits
Valentine has worked extensively in London's West End on many musical productions including:
 Cats
 Miss Saigon
 Cabaret - Aldwych
 Kiss Me, Kate - Victoria Palace & RSC
 Camelot - Covent Garden Festival
 Chicago - Adelphi/Moscow/Gottenburg/Madrid/Tokyo/Seoul
 Acorn Antiques! (Haymarket)
 Nine - Donmar Warehouse
 Damn Yankees - Adelphi
 Children Will Listen - Colisseum
 Sinatra at the London Palladium - London Palladium
 My One and Only - Piccadilly
 Maria Friedman's Rearranged - Trafalgar
 Closer Than Ever - Vaudeville
 Oh Kay! - Chichester
 Sleep With Friends - UK Tour
 42nd Street - Theatre Royal
 Oliver! - UK & Canada
 Merrily We Roll Along - Donmar Warehouse
 Anything Goes - West End/National Theatre
 Company - West End
 Sondheim At 80  (Donmar at Queen's)
 Kiss of the Spider Woman - West End
The Pajama Game (Chichester Festival Theatre)
Guys & Dolls (Chichester Festival Theatre)
National Theatre 50th Anniversary TV event
Home (National Theatre/The Shed)
 Porgy and Bess - West End
 Wicked - West End
 The King and I - In the round, Royal Albert Hall with RPO
 Into The Woods, Open Air Theatre, Regent's Park
 End Of The Rainbow Trafalgar Studios
 Crazy For You Novello Theatre, West End
Strictly Gershwin (ENB) Albert Hall/National Tour
Brynfest with Bryn Terfel and WNO Orchestra (RFH)
City Of Angels (Donmar)
Singin' In The Rain (Chatelet, Paris)
Follies (Royal Albert Hall, London)
42nd Street (Chatelet, Paris)
Strictly Gershwin (Tulsa Ballet USA)
Ruthless! (Arts Theatre, West End)
Me & My Girl (Chichester Festival Theatre)
Sweet Charity (Donmar)

Recordings
Album recordings include: 
Love Never Dies
Musicality
Anything Goes
The Baker’s Wife
Company
Chicago
Kiss of the Spiderwoman
Tonight’s The Night
Requiem

References

Rainbow Network - Interview with Gareth Valentine, 30 November 2001
The Daily Telegraph - 10/11/2004 "Musicals are still calling the tune," says Sarah Crompton Quotes Valentine as saying: "Musical theatre is a great confectionery of ingredients. When it is done right, it is the most exciting thing."
The Daily Telegraph - Dominic Cavendish reviews Porgy and Bess at the Savoy Theatre "With the aid of composer Gareth Valentine, Nunn's production has cut down the original running time"
Porgy and Bess (UK production) - Gareth Valentine

British composers
Living people
1956 births
Alumni of the Royal College of Music
People educated at Ysgol Rhiwabon